Fabreville is a district in Laval, Quebec. It was a separate city until the municipal mergers on August 6, 1965.

Geography 
Fabreville is delimited north-west by the Rivière des Mille-Îles, north-east by Sainte-Rose, south-east by Chomedey, south by Sainte-Dorothée and west by Laval-Ouest.

The postal code for Fabreville is H7P and H7R.

Education
Commission scolaire de Laval operates French-language public schools.
 École secondaire Poly-Jeunesse (junior high school)
 École primaire Coeur-Soleil
 École primaire Des Cèdres
 École primaire L’Orée-des-Bois
 École primaire La Source
 École primaire Le Petit-Prince
 École primaire Marc-Aurèle-Fortin
 École primaire Pépin

Sir Wilfrid Laurier School Board operates English-language public schools. Elementary schools serving sections of Fabreville:
 Our Lady of Peace Elementary School
 Twin Oaks Elementary School
All sections of Laval are zoned to Laval Junior Academy and Laval Senior Academy

References

External links

City of Laval, official website

Neighbourhoods in Laval, Quebec
Former municipalities in Quebec
Populated places disestablished in 1965
Canada geography articles needing translation from French Wikipedia